Zeki Öztürk (born 22 December 1965 in Istanbul) is a retired Turkish athlete who competed in middle- and long distance running. He represented his country at the 1988 and 1992 Summer Olympics as well as three consecutive World Championships.

He is the husband of fellow runner, Lale Öztürk.

Competition record

Personal bests
Outdoor
1500 metres – 3:35.68 (Bologna 1990)
3000 metres – 7:47.52 (Udine 1990)
5000 metres – 13:26.77 (Zürich 1990)
10,000 metres – 28:19.77 (Rome 1995)
Half marathon – 1:03:04 (Istanbul 1987)
Marathon – 2:23:07 (Istanbul 2001)

Indoor
3000 metres – 7:50.41 (Genoa 1992)

References

1965 births
Living people
Sportspeople from Istanbul
Turkish male middle-distance runners
Turkish male long-distance runners
Olympic athletes of Turkey
Athletes (track and field) at the 1988 Summer Olympics
Athletes (track and field) at the 1992 Summer Olympics
World Athletics Championships athletes for Turkey
Universiade medalists in athletics (track and field)
Mediterranean Games silver medalists for Turkey
Mediterranean Games bronze medalists for Turkey
Mediterranean Games medalists in athletics
Athletes (track and field) at the 1987 Mediterranean Games
Athletes (track and field) at the 1991 Mediterranean Games
Athletes (track and field) at the 1997 Mediterranean Games
Universiade silver medalists for Turkey
Medalists at the 1989 Summer Universiade